South Korea was the host nation of the 2014 Asian Games held in Incheon from 19 September to 4 October 2014. South Korea was represented by the Korean Olympic Committee, and the South Korean delegation was the largest in this edition of the Asian Games. The delegation of 1,068 people included 831 competitors (454 men, 377 women) and 237 officials.

Competitors from the South Korea led the bronze medal count with 84 in the general medal table. South Korea also won 79 gold medals, 70 silver medals and a total of 228 medals, finishing second on the medal table.

Medal summary

Medal table

Medalists

Multiple Gold Medalists

Gold Medal

Silver Medal

Bronze Medal

Archery

Recurve

Men

Women

Compound

Men

Women

Badminton

Men

Mixed

Baseball

Men

Preliminary round

Group B

Semifinals

finals

Fencing

Men

Women

Football

Men

Pool Matches

Group A

Round of 16

Quarter-finals

Semi-finals

Final

Women
Pool matches
Group A

Quarter-finals

Semi-finals

Bronze medal match

Shooting

Men

Women

Wushu

Taolu

Men

Women

Sanda

Men

Women

References

Nations at the 2014 Asian Games
2014
Asian Games